Kafr Laqif is a Palestinian village in the Qalqilya Governorate in the western West Bank, located 22 kilometers southwest of Nablus. According to the Palestinian Central Bureau of Statistics, the village had a population of approximately 984 inhabitants in 2006.

Location
It is bordered by Hajja to the east, Wadi Qana to the south, ‘Azzun to the west, and Khirbet Sir and Baqat al Hatab to the north.

History
Ceramics from the Byzantine era has been found here.

Ottoman era
Kafr Laqif, like all of Palestine was incorporated into the Ottoman Empire in 1517, and in the 1596 tax registers, it was part of the nahiya ("subdistrict") of Bani Sa'b, part of the larger Sanjak of Nablus. It had a population of 15 households, all Muslims. The inhabitants paid a fixed tax rate of 33,3% on agricultural products, including wheat, barley, summer crops, olive trees, goats and beehives, in addition to occasional revenues and a fixed tax for people of Nablus area; a total of 10,740 akçe. 37.5% of the revenue went to a Muslim charitable endowment.

In 1838, Robinson noted Kefr Lakif as a Muslim village in the Beni Sa'ab district, west of Nablus.

In 1882, the PEF's Survey of Western Palestine (SWP) described Kefr Lekif as resembling Kafr Jammal, that is: "a small stone village on a knoll, with cisterns."

British Mandate era
In the 1922 census of Palestine conducted by the British Mandate authorities, Kufr Laqef had a population of 95 Muslims, increasing in the 1931 census to 141 Muslims, in 27 houses.

In the 1945 statistics the population of Kafr Laqif was 210 Muslims, while the total land area was 2,854 dunams, according to an official land and population survey. Of this, 477 were allocated for plantations and irrigable land, 840 for cereals, while 19 dunams were classified as built-up (urban) areas.

Jordanian era
In the wake of the 1948 Arab–Israeli War, and after the 1949 Armistice Agreements, Kafr Laqif came under Jordanian rule.

The Jordanian census of 1961 found 304 inhabitants.

Post 1967
During the Six-Day War in 1967, Kafr Laqif came under Israeli occupation. 

After the 1995 accords, 28.2% of village land is classified as Area B land, while the remaining 71.8% is classified as Area C land. The Israelis have expropriated land in Kafr Laqif for its settlements, most notably Karne Shomron and its environs. In addition, according to the plans, (as of 2007) the Israeli West Bank barrier will isolate 657 dunums (22.8% of the village’s total area) on the western Israeli side of the wall.

References

Bibliography

External links
Welcome To Kafr Laqif
Survey of Western Palestine, Map 11:   IAA, Wikimedia commons 
Kafr Laqif Village (Fact Sheet), Applied Research Institute–Jerusalem (ARIJ)
Kafr Laqif Village Profile, ARIJ
Kafr Laqif, aerial photo, ARIJ
Development Priorities and Needs in Kafr Laqif, ARIJ

Villages in the West Bank